The Minnesota Senate, District 36 encompasses portions of Hennepin County and Anoka County in the northern Twin Cities metropolitan area. Before 2010, the district represented portions of Dakota County and portions of Goodhue County, and was one of eleven Senate Districts within Minnesota Congressional District 2. The district is currently represented by Democratic-Farmer-Labor Senator John Hoffman.

References 

 Minnesota State Legislature

External links 
 State of Minnesota Pollfinder Website

Minnesota Senate districts
Dakota County, Minnesota
Goodhue County, Minnesota